Talitha (Classical Syriac: ܛܠܝܼܬ݂ܵܐ/ܛܠܻܝܬ݂ܳܐ ṭlīṯā or ṭlīṯō) is an uncommon feminine name given in reference to the Biblical story in the Gospel of Mark in which Jesus Christ was said to have resurrected a dead child with the words "Talitha cumi" or "Talitha kum" or "Talitha koum," often translated as  "Little girl, I say to you, arise!"  Some sources say the Aramaic word could be translated as  little lamb, while others say the word refers to a young girl.

History of usage
It was among many names taken from the Bible that were used by Puritans in the American colonial era. Talitha Cumi Elderkin Stiles, a schoolteacher, born in Hartford, Connecticut in 1779, was one of only three original settlers of Cleveland who stayed there over the first winter of 1796–1797 when, attended by Seneca Native American women, she gave birth to Charles Stiles, the first white child born in the Western Reserve. Six decades later, eleven-year-old Talitha Dunlap was among the between 120 and 140 men, women and children who were killed during the 1857 Mountain Meadows Massacre. The name ranked 1,108 among names given to American girls born in 1881. The name was also occasionally used in England by 1861, when the christening of a girl named Talitha-Cumi People was reported in The Times. It remains in occasional use in the United States and other countries. Sixty-eight newborn American girls were given the name in 2020 and fifty-one newborn American girls were given the name in 2021.

In Brazil, Talita (or Talitha/Thalita) was the 100th most common name for newborn girls in 2009.

Star name
While the personal name is most often derived from the Biblical story, Talitha is also the name of two stars, Talitha Borealis and Talitha Australis, in the Ursa Major constellation. The names of the stars are derived from the Arabic word for 'third' in the phrase  meaning 'The third leap [of the gazelle]', referring to an Arabic story about a startled gazelle which leapt three times to different points in the constellation.

People
Talitha Bateman (born 2001), American actress
Talitha Cummins, Australian journalist
Talitha Diggs (born 2002), American athlete
Talitha Espiritu, Filipino author and academic known for her work on cinema during the Marcos dictatorship
Talitha Gerlach (1896-1995), American YWCA worker who spent most of her life as a social worker in Shanghai, China, where she died
Talitha Getty (1940-1971), Dutch actress, socialite, and model who was regarded as a style icon of the late 1960s
Talitha Irakau (born 1995), Papua New Guinean footballer who plays as a defender
Talitha MacKenzie, Scottish-American world music recording artist, and historical dance and music teacher and performer
Talitha Stevenson (born 1977), British author and journalist
Talitha Washington (born 1974), American mathematician and academic

References
Bardsley, Charles Wareing Endell (1880). Curiosities of Puritan Nomenclature Chatto and Windus.

Notes

English feminine given names
Telugu names